Joseph Nelson Hallock House, also known as the Ann Currie-Bell House, is a historic home located at Southold in Suffolk County, New York. It is a two-story, five bay Shingle Style dwelling with a cross gabled, gambrel style cedar shingled roof.  It is part of an outdoor museum complex operated by the Southold Historical Society.

The house was built in 1900 for Joseph N. Hallock.

It was added to the National Register of Historic Places in 2005.

References

External links
Southold Historical Society

Houses on the National Register of Historic Places in New York (state)
Museums in Suffolk County, New York
Shingle Style houses
Houses in Suffolk County, New York
Historic house museums in New York (state)
Historical society museums in New York (state)
National Register of Historic Places in Suffolk County, New York
Shingle Style architecture in New York (state)